The 2012–13 Men's FIH Hockey World League Final took place between 10–18 January 2014 in New Delhi, India.

The Netherlands won the tournament for the first time after defeating New Zealand 7–2 in the final. England won the third place match by defeating Australia 2–1.

Qualification
The host nation qualified automatically in addition to 7 teams qualified from the Semifinals. The following eight teams, shown with final pre-tournament rankings, competed in this round of the tournament.

Umpires
Below are the 10 umpires appointed by the International Hockey Federation:

Murray Grime (AUS)
Marcin Grochal (POL)
Andrew Kennedy (ENG)
Kim Hong-lae (KOR)
Satoshi Kondo (JAP)
Germán Montes de Oca (ARG)
Raghu Prasad (IND)
Gary Simmonds (RSA)
Gregory Uyttenhove (BEL)
Roel van Eert (NED)

Results
All times are Indian Standard Time (UTC+05:30)

First round

Pool A

Pool B

Second round

Quarterfinals

Fifth to eighth place classification

Crossover

Seventh and eighth place

Fifth and sixth place

First to fourth place classification

Semifinals

Third and fourth place

Final

Awards

Statistics

Final standings

Goalscorers

References

External links
Official website

Final
FIH Hockey World League Final Men
International field hockey competitions hosted by India